NBA Live 06 is a 2005 installment of the NBA Live series released on the Xbox, Xbox 360, GameCube, Microsoft Windows, PlayStation Portable, PlayStation 2 and Mobile. It was developed by EA Sports. The game features several game modes, including Dynasty, Season, Playoffs, or Free Play. It features Dwyane Wade of the Miami Heat on the cover. This was the last NBA Live game on the GameCube and it also was the first NBA Live game on the Xbox 360 as a launch title and on the PlayStation Portable.

Gameplay

Dynasty mode
In Dynasty Mode, the game player chooses one team (excluding the All-Star Teams) and runs a dynasty which overlaps many seasons. Decisions are made as to the number of games per season, the difficulty level, trade players, and sign new players along with hiring coaches. Games can be simulated. Dynasty Mode contains an All-Star weekend, except the players or rosters are according to the Dynasty Season. The game player hires the coaching staff and runs a training camp which may be simulated. There is also a trade deadline.
This mode is not on the PSP version.

Season mode
In Season Mode, the gamer plays only a single season of basketball. The gamer can trade, sign, and drop players.

Playoffs mode
In the Playoffs, the game player participates in the playoffs with teams either from the Eastern or Western Conference. The default teams are those that were in the 2004-05 playoffs.

All-Star Weekend
In the All-Star Weekend mode, the game player can choose to participate in a rookie game, a dunk contest, or a 3-point contest. In the dunk contest, fancy dunks are attempted and the player with the most points wins. In the 3 point contest, as many 3 pointers are attempted as possible. Both the 3 Point Shootout and the Slam Dunk Contest are announced by TNT Inside the NBA analyst Kenny Smith.

Reception

The Xbox, PSP, PlayStation 2 and GameCube versions received "generally favorable reviews", while the PC and Xbox 360 versions received "mixed or average reviews" according to video game review aggregator Metacritic. In Japan, Famitsu gave the PS2 version a score of all four eights for a total of 32 out of 40; the same magazine gave the Xbox 360 version a score of two eights and two sevens for a total of 30 out of 40, while giving the PSP version a score of one eight, two sevens, and one six, for a total of 28 out of 40.  Famitsu Xbox 360, on the other hand, gave its Xbox 360 version a score of all four eights, for a total of 32 out of 40.

See also
NBA 2K6

References

External links

Xbox 360 games
NBA Live
Electronic Arts games
GameCube games
PlayStation 2 games
PlayStation Portable games
Video games developed in Canada
Xbox games
Windows games
2005 video games
Video games set in 2006
Mobile games
Video games using Havok